Kristine Valdresdatter may refer to:
 Kristine Valdresdatter (film), a Norwegian film from 1935 on List of Norwegian films of the 1930s
 NSB Cmb Class 17, a Norwegian train